Sahuaro High School is a public high school located in Tucson, Arizona, United States, part of the Tucson Unified School District. It is located on the far east side of the city at 545 North Camino Seco, just north of Vicksburg Street between Broadway and Speedway Boulevards. The school's mascot is the cougar, and its colors are scarlet and navy.

The school scored 87/83/23/81 on the AIMS (Arizona Instruments to Measure Standards) tests in Reading/Math/Science/Writing.

Programs
 Advanced placement courses in art history, calculus, English, government, United States history, music theory, psychology
 Biochemistry research
 Video production
 Speech
 Construction technology
 Family and consumer sciences
 Cooperative office education
 Jazz band
 Life skills
 4th R Partners-in-Education
 Distributive Education Clubs of America (DECA)
 Concert and cadet orchestras
 Award-winning student council
 Concert choir and vocal ensemble

Notable alumni
 Andy Biggs – Arizona lawmaker, U.S. House of Representatives 
 Brooke Burke – television personality and model
 John Butcher – former MLB player (Texas Rangers, Minnesota Twins, Cleveland Indians)  
 Jay Dobyns (1980) – US Justice Department (ATF) Agent
 Robert William Fisher – fugitive wanted by the FBI
 Reggie Fowler (1977) – Arizona businessman and part-owner of NFL's Minnesota Vikings
 Chad Griggs – former UFC fighter
 Sammy Khalifa – former MLB baseball player
 Matthew Lohmeier – Former US Space Force Lt. Colonel 
 John Mistler (1977) – former NFL wide receiver (New York Giants and Buffalo Bills)
 Jim Olander – former MLB player (Milwaukee Brewers)
 Rodney Peete –  former NFL quarterback
 Cindy Flom Rarick (1978) – former LPGA golfer
 Jeff Rein (1970) – former CEO of Walgreens
 Scott Sanders (1976) – Rear Admiral, US Navy; now VP of Wyle Laboratories Aerospace Group
 Alex Verdugo – MLB player for the Boston Red Sox
 Tom Wiedenbauer – former MLB player (Houston Astros)
 Skip Peete - Long time NFL Coach (Oakland Raiders, Dallas Cowboys, Chicago Bears, Los Angeles Rams

References 

Public high schools in Arizona
Educational institutions established in 1968
Schools in Tucson, Arizona